Bandeli (also romanized as Bandelī; also known as Mandalī) is a village in Bastam Rural District, in the Central District of Chaypareh County, West Azerbaijan Province, Iran. At the time of the 2006 census, its population was 89 across 23 families.

References 

Populated places in Chaypareh County